Orlec  is a village on the island of Cres in Croatia.

References

Populated places in Primorje-Gorski Kotar County
Cres